Persephone's Bees is an Oakland-based pop/rock/electropop music group.

History
Growing up in Pyatigorsk, Russia, lead singer Angelina Moysov was musically inspired by her family: her mother played traditional folk/gypsy music while her brother played modern music. Her family brought her to America in 1993, in 2000 she formed Persephone's Bees with Tom Ayres (who plays guitar), Paul Bertolino (drums), and Bart Davenport (bass).  The band has featured several bass players including Mike Ferrel and Ethan Parsonage.

Their first LP, City of Love, was nominated for best debut album at the California Music Awards, along with being voted "Best Bay Area Pop Band" by SF Weekly.  In 2006 they signed to Columbia Records and released their major label debut, Notes from the Underworld. The debut single reached No. 3 in Billboard Magazine's Club & Dance charts. "City of Love" was also featured in the opening scene and soundtrack to the movie Bewitched starring Will Ferrell and Nichole Kidman. "Muzika Dlya Fil'ma" was featured as soundtrack in EA Sports game, FIFA 07. Also their single "Nice Day" appeared on the soundtrack of the 2007 film, Nancy Drew.

They toured with The New Cars as their opening act during their Winter Road Rage Tour '06.

The band's songs have appeared on The Sopranos ("Home" in episode "Cold Stones"), Weeds ("Little Boxes" in Season 3), and numerous film, TV, and commercial placements including Hilton Hotels, Cingular and more.

Persephone's Bees have been featured on popular music outlets such as MTV's "You Hear It First" (SXSW 2006 "Hot Bands to see"), Nic Harcourt's KCRW show Morning Becomes Eclectic, and Yahoo Music.

Angelina Moysov's most recent side project is pop/rock band Candy Now!, which she formed with Blag Dahlia of The Dwarves.

In October 2010, the band relocated to New York and while on tour recorded and released a free download of Leonard Cohen's "First We Take Manhattan".

Shortly afterwards Persephone's Bees announced the self-release of their new album New In Berlin. All the songs from the album were digitally released as singles every 6 weeks and in July, 2012 Persephone's Bees announced the release of the record as a vinyl with digital download of all the songs plus extra songs sung in Russian, German and French.
Currently Angelina is working on her solo record and getting ready to record a new Persephone's Bees album.

Albums
City of Love (2002)
Notes from the Underworld (2006)
Selections from the forthcoming new album (EP) (2010)
New In Berlin (vinyl) (2012)

External links

Persephone's Bees at Facebook
"Nice Day" as an official sound of 118.008 service of the France's PagesJaunes

American pop rock music groups
Musical groups from Oakland, California